Damaraju Raghavarao (1938–2013) was an Indian-born statistician, formerly the Laura H. Carnell professor of statistics and chair of the department of statistics at Temple University in Philadelphia.

Raghavarao is an elected fellow of the Institute of Mathematical Statistics, American Statistical Association, and an elected member of The International Statistical Institute. He has been specialized in combinatorics and applications of experimental designs.

Raghavarao received his M.A. in mathematics from Nagpur University, India in 1957 and earned the gold medal. He earned his  Ph.D. in statistics from the University of Mumbai in 1961 for his work in designs of experiments; his Ph.D. advisor was M. C. Chakrabarti. Raghavarao was a professor of statistics at Punjab Agricultural University, University of North Carolina at Chapel Hill, Cornell University, and University of Guelph before joining Temple University.

He died on February 6, 2013.

Books

References

External links
 
  Webpage at Temple university
 Brief Resume of Damaraju Raghavarao

Indian statisticians
American statisticians 
Fellows of the American Statistical Association
1938 births
2013 deaths
Indian combinatorialists
University of Mumbai alumni
Temple University faculty
Fellows of the Institute of Mathematical Statistics
Elected Members of the International Statistical Institute
Scientists from Andhra Pradesh
20th-century Indian mathematicians